The Photograph is a 2007 Indonesian film directed by Nan Achnas. The film won the 2008 Special Jury Prize at the 43rd Karlovy Vary International Film Festival and the NETPAC Award at the Taipei Golden Horse Film Festival 2008.

Synopsis
Sita is a karaoke bar hostess and a prostitute. When she is beaten up by a group of drunken men, she is saved by Johan. Johan is an old Chinese-Indonesian who is traveling as a photographer. Then Sita offers herself as Johan's servant without being paid. Sita doesn't know that their relationship will change their lives.

Cast
Shanty
Lim Kay Tong
Lukman Sardi
Indy Barends

References

External links
 
 "The Photograph" at TheBestMovieReview.com
  Global Film Initiative Film Catalogue

2007 films
2000s Indonesian-language films
2007 drama films
Films shot in Indonesia
Indonesian drama films